Dendyidae is a family of calcareous sponges, which contains thirteen species in two genera.

Dendyidae contains the following genera and species:

 Genus Dendya
 Dendya amitsbo Hozawa, 1929
 Dendya cavata (Carter, 1886)
 Dendya clathrata (Carter, 1883)
 Dendya quadripodifera Hozawa, 1929
 Dendya tripodifera (Carter, 1886)
 Dendya triradiata Tanita, 1943
 Genus Soleneiscus
 Soleneiscus apicalis (Brøndsted, 1931)
 Soleneiscus hispida (Brøndsted, 1931)
 Soleneiscus irregularis (Jenkin, 1908)
 Soleneiscus japonicus (Haeckel, 1872)
 Soleneiscus olynthus (Borojevic & Boury-Esnault, 1987)
 Soleneiscus radovani Wörheide & Hooper, 1999
 Soleneiscus stolonifer (Dendy, 1891)

References 

Clathrinida